Cryptolechia stictifascia is a moth in the family Depressariidae. It was described by Wang in 2003. It is found in the Chinese provinces of Fujian, Guizhou and Shaanxi.

References

Moths described in 2003
Cryptolechia (moth)